J. R. R. Tolkien's novels The Hobbit (1937) and The Lord of the Rings (1954–55), set in Middle-earth, have been the subject of numerous motion picture adaptations, whether for film (cinema), television, or streaming. There were many early failed attempts to bring the fictional universe to life on screen, some even rejected by the author himself, who was skeptical of the prospects of an adaptation. While animated and live-action shorts were made in 1967 and 1971, the first commercial depiction of the book onscreen was in an animated TV special in 1977. In 1978 the first big screen adaptation of the fictional setting was introduced in the animated The Lord of the Rings.

The rights to adapt Tolkien's works passed through the hands of several studios, having been briefly leased to Rembrandt films before being sold perpetually to United Artists, who then passed them in part to Saul Zaentz (which did business as Middle-earth Enterprises). During this time, filmmakers who attempted to adapt Tolkien's works include William Snyder, Peter Shaffer, John Boorman, Ralph Bakshi, Peter Jackson and Guillermo del Toro. Other filmmakers and producers who were interested in an adaptation included Walt Disney, Al Brodax, Forrest J Ackerman, Samuel Gelfman, Denis O'Dell (who contacted David Lean, Stanley Kubrick and Michelangelo Antonioni to direct), and Heinz Edelmann.

New Line Cinema released the first part of director Peter Jackson's The Lord of the Rings film series in 2001 as part of a trilogy and several actors and roles were introduced once again in a prequel trilogy in The Hobbit film series, also producing a short film to promote the video game Middle-earth: Shadow of War in 2017, and an animated prequel film, subtitled The War of the Rohirrim, in 2024. In 2017, Amazon bought the television rights to adapt a new prequel streaming television series set in the Second Age, a period glimpsed in flashback in The Lord of the Rings films as The Rings of Power. The first season began in September 2022. In February 2023, a new film reboot of the franchise was announced to be in early development from Warner Bros. and New Line Cinema.

Collectively, the New Line franchise has received a record 37 Academy Award nominations, winning 17, and three special awards, also a record. Along with The Godfather film series, it is one of two film series to date to have received three Best Picture nominations. The third film in Peter Jackson's trilogy, The Lord of the Rings: The Return of the King, was the first and, as of 2020, the only high-fantasy film to win Best Picture. Along with Titanic and Ben-Hur, The Lord of the Rings: The Return of the King holds the record for Academy Awards won by a single film and is the only one of the three films to win every category for which it was nominated.

Well-received fan films of Middle-earth include The Hunt for Gollum and Born of Hope, which were uploaded to YouTube on 8 May 2009 and 11 December 2009 respectively.

Early attempts 

Tolkien watched films, but always had a mistrust of the medium and of his books' suitability for dramatization. He had received fanmail on the matter, some proposing to adapt the works to film and some encouraging him to refuse such proposals. Tolkien and his publishers, Allen and Unwin, were willing to play along with film proposals, on condition of having a veto on creative decisions or relinquishing those for a sufficient sum of money.

Walt Disney 

In 1938, just as Tolkien began to work on The Lord of the Rings, Walt Disney considered adapting The Hobbit to animation. An animator of Disney's sent a memo suggesting that elements of The Hobbit and Richard Wagner's Ring cycle could be incorporated into Fantasia which was then in the making. According to the animator Wolfgang Reitherman, Walt Disney wanted to make a Lord of the Rings feature in the 1950s, but his storyboard artists deemed it too complex, too lengthy, and too scary for a Disney feature. In 1972, the storyboard artist Vance Gerry pitched an animated adaptation dedicated to The Hobbit. He illustrated Bilbo, and produced a synopsis of the work, prefacing that the Disney studios had "never done a cartoon with this much story", admitting that "there are far more incidents in the story than we could ever use" and that "many sections are too frightening for our purposes."

Al Brodax 

In June 1956, animator Al Brodax reached out to Tolkien's publisher's with a proposal for an animated film adaptation of his works. The final volume of The Lord of the Rings had only just been published in the US, and did not yet achieve the commercial success it would later find with the counter-culture movement, but Brodax apparently wanted to adapt it to animation. Tolkien, nearing retirement and yet to see substantial commercial success from his writings, was cautiously interested, saying he should "welcome the idea" of a film, "quite apart from the glint of money", but nothing came out of it.

Forrest J. Ackerman 

In 1956, Tolkien was approached by the American agent Forrest J. Ackerman about producing an animated film based on Tolkien's work for the amateur screenwriter Morton Grady Zimmerman. Ackerman showed Tolkien artwork by Ron Cobb and pitched Zimmerman's story synopsis, which proposed condensing the story to a three-hour film with two intermissions. Tolkien said it was described to him as an animated film, but he professed to being ignorant of the process, and it is possible that Ackerman wished to make a primarily live-action film, using animation, stop-motion and miniature photography. Cobb scouted locations around California, impressing Tolkien with pictures of mountains and deserts.

Tolkien already had objections – Lothlórien was described to him as a fairy-castle, and he did not like the condensed story – but he liked the concept art, which he thought akin to Arthur Rackham as opposed to Walt Disney, whom he loathed. While Tolkien noted that a film "would be pleasant", he delayed in reviewing the synopsis until urged by Unwin. When he delivered his initial notes to Ackerman, the agent was granted a six-month option if he could find a producer to finance the project. He intended to make the film with American International Pictures, but its president James Nicholson declined, as did other studio heads.

Tolkien was sent a 55-page treatment by Zimmerman, which he greatly disliked. Keeping his publisher's financial interests in mind (and his own, as he neared retirement), Tolkien was polite but largely criticized the script. He complained of divergence from not only the tone of the book (such as cutting elements "upon which [its] characteristic and peculiar tone principally depends") but also the character representation (such as Sam's leaving Frodo to Shelob and going on to Mount Doom alone). He took issue with dialogue changes as regards to the "style and sentiment" of characters, and with intercutting between the storylines of Frodo and Aragorn, instead of the interlacing in the book. He suggested eliminating the battle of Helm's Deep to better emphasize the defence of Minas Tirith, and cutting characters instead of diminishing their roles. Tolkien protested against added "incantations, blue lights, and some irrelevant magic" and "a preference for fights".

Nevertheless, Tolkien did not wish to kill the project, saying "I think [it] promised well on the pictorial side." Ackerman filed to extend his lease to a year, but he was unable to pay for the extension, and negotiations ended. The treatment was criticised by Ian Nathan, Tom Shippey and others; Kristin Thompson noted the amateur nature of the enterprise, saying that it never represented a serious attempt to make a commercial film. Zimmerman, who avoided filmmaking after this ordeal, donated his script to the Tolkien collection.

Robert Gutwillig 

In 1959, Tolkien entered brief negotiations with Robert Gutwillig to adapt The Lord of the Rings. Tolkien told Gutwillig he had "given a considerable amount of time and thought" to a film adaptation, noting "some ideas concerning what I think would be desirable" as well as the "difficulties" involved. Tolkien spoke with Gutwillig's agent and producer, Samuel W. Gelfman. Their discussion was apparently amicable; Tolkien found Gelfman intelligent and reasonable, and Gelfman later recalled that they talked about the details of an adaptation. Tolkien directed Gelfman to his publishers, but nothing came out of it.

Tolkien later received a suggestion in fan-mail to have The Hobbit adapted to a serial in four intervals, which was declined by his publisher Rayner Unwin for its potential to "incarcerate us in the local odeons for nine or ten hours."

Rembrandt films 

In 1961, William L. Snyder negotiated the rights to adapt The Hobbit to animation for his Oscar-winning company, Rembrandt films. He leased The Hobbit for five years. Due to a mishap in the publishing of the first edition, the book was public domain in the US; Snyder renegotiated the lease to give Tolkien and Unwin only a $15,000 advance. Tolkien thought Snyder was "sure to perpetrate [...] many objectionable things" but leased the rights to the producer in 1962. Snyder commissioned cartoonist Gene Deitch to write a script for a feature-length Hobbit cartoon; this took liberties with the text, inserting a princess of Dale who undertakes the Quest and ends up married to Bilbo. Deitch was unaware of The Lord of the Rings until later, when he incorporated the concept of the Ring of Power into the Gollum (or Goloom, as he is called in the piece) episode later in the writing, making a sequel based on The Lord of the Rings possible.

When a deal with 20th Century Fox fell through and the rights were due to expire, Snyder commissioned Deitch to quickly make a condensed film to fulfil the requirements of the contract. The deal was for an animated, colour film but did not specify length; Deitch was told to compress the story into an animated short, screened in New York in 1967 to prolong Snyder's now-valuable lease on the rights.

Deitch's film was the first onscreen depiction of any of Tolkien's works, but it was little more than a narrated picture-book, with a narrator telling the 12-minute short story over a series of animation stills. It was exhibited only once, in a projection room at New York to around twelve spectators who were pulled from the street, provided the admission money by the exhibitors so that they could sign a document stating that they paid to see a colour film based on The Hobbit.

Deitch stated that the extended lease included the rights to The Lord of the Rings, and that the rights to both novels were sold back to Tolkien for a higher price. However, publisher Sir Stanley Unwin maintains that Snyder continued to hold only the rights to The Hobbit, and that they were then sold directly to United Artists when they secured the rights to The Lord of the Rings.

Tolkien negotiated television rights separately. Carole Ward suggested adapting The Lord of the Rings for television in 1964, to air on the newly launched BBC2. ITV launched a competing offer, according to which the book would be adapted via puppetry, which Tolkien found contemptuous. Another attempt at purchasing the television rights was made in 1968, which would have put it concurrently with the cinema rights being sold to United Artists.

United Artists 

The idea of live-action fantasy became fashionable in the early 1960s due to the success of Ray Harryhausen's stop-motion productions. By 1967, Gelfman established Katzka-Bernie productions with Gabriel Katzka and entered negotiations with Tolkien to adapt The Lord of the Rings for United Artists, "with an option for The Hobbit." As was the case with Snyder, the emerging contracts would provide United Artists with complete creative freedom over the works, and even offered UA first bidding at the television rights, which were negotiated separately but never sold to them.

Meanwhile, a couple of American teenagers unsuccessfully attempted to obtain the rights to The Hobbit. Joy Hill, Tolkien's secretary who worked for Allen & Unwin, was said to have contacted Disney for the rights at the time, and it was possible this was done to place United Artists in a competitive position. MGM were also said to have been interested in the rights at the time.

United Artists were the studio behind several of the lucrative widescreen epics of the decade. In the 1960s, long widescreen epics (presented as a roadshow with an intermission) still proved successful, but few sequels were made in that genre, and therefore Katzka-Bernie commissioned Sir Peter Shaffer to write a treatment for a single, three-hour film adaptation of The Lord of the Rings, which was deemed "elegant", keeping The Hobbit in mind as a potential prequel. Merchandising was of little concern at the time, but the rights to make profit from such products were included in the contract. Negotiations extended until 1969, when the rights were sold off for $250,000 (adjusted for inflation, the modern equivalent is about $1.5 million) and 7.5% of gross receipts, minus expenses, to be paid to Tolkien. Shaffer's script never got off the ground, but the rights were sold to United Artists in perpetuity, including the option to pass the rights to another studio. The singer Arlo Guthrie pitched an animated feature to the studio, but UA were adamant they wanted the film to be live-action, although the contract options an animated film.

Stanley Unwin suggested that Tolkien's inexperience in dealing with movie producers led to the generous conditions of the contract. Now elderly, Tolkien's desire to set up a trust fund for his grandchildren could indicate that he might not have expected to live and see the resulting film, and wanted to use the profits to take care of his ailing wife. The increase in income tax rates at the time decreased Tolkien's profits from book sales, and he expected a fall-off in the sales in years to come. In 1968, Tolkien expressed skepticism about adapting his works to film, saying "it's easier to film the Odyssey".

Apple Films 

The Beatles were on a three-picture deal with United Artists. Their previous two features, A Hard Day's Night and Help!, directed by Richard Lester, were successful. When it became clear that the animated Yellow Submarine would not count as part of this deal, Denis O'Dell (head of the Beatles' Apple Films) entered negotiations for their third film. He came up with the idea of a Lord of the Rings "multimedia musical extravaganza", starring the Beatles as the four Hobbits. He learned that United Artists were in negotiations for the rights.

In conversation with studio heads David and Arnold Picker, it was decided that a "star director" was required. O'Dell shortlisted David Lean, Stanley Kubrick, and Michelangelo Antonioni. Lean declined. O'Dell left to India to visit the Beatles, with the books in his suitcase. At the behest of Donovan, the band examined the books and began to think "seriously" about the idea. According to O'Dell, John Lennon fancied the role of Gandalf, but George Harrison recalled that Lennon then wanted to swap for Frodo. Ringo Starr wanted to play Sam, while Paul McCartney coveted Frodo. He told Jackson that Lennon would have been Gollum, Ringo Sam, and Harrison Gandalf. Donovan was keen on Merry, and they wanted Twiggy for Galadriel.

Kubrick declined, telling O'Dell the books were excellent, but "unfilmable". Kubrick had worked on genre films and had pioneered special effects in 2001: A Space Odyssey, but it proved complex to produce, and he had difficulty depicting the aliens onscreen, which would have made him wary of the prospect of rendering fantasy creatures. He was still promoting that film and it was not making the box-office returns that he had hoped for. Chris Conkling and Peter Jackson later said that making it live-action at the time was inconceivable; Ralph Bakshi said it could have been made, but would have been "very tacky."

Heinz Edelmann, a fan of the book and art director on Yellow Submarine, pitched his own idea for an adaptation to United Artists. Thinking that a "straight" adaptation of the story was impossible, he wanted to do an animated film in the style of Fantasia or "rock opera" with a Kurosawa-like aesthetic. He considered the Rolling Stones to star, but then latched onto the Beatles; however, United Artists wanted a live-action film.

O'Dell talked to Antonioni, who is said to have been keener, but the project never started. The group argued over their desired parts, and Harrison and McCartney were skeptical. McCartney remembers that Tolkien had reservations. There were false rumours that the Beatles and Kubrick talked about an adaptation in 1965.
After the rights were secured and John Boorman made his script, the idea of casting the Beatles (as the four Hobbits) was brought back to the table by David Picker, until the band's separation became publicly known in 1970. In retrospect, O'Dell is skeptical of the whole venture. Others involved had since described the project as  "inspired showmanship."

John Boorman 

In 1969, John Boorman approached David Picker about an Arthurian epic; Picker instead commissioned him to do The Lord of the Rings as a single, three-hour film. Boorman thought it impossible, but allowed himself to be persuaded. The project was announced in 1970, to be co-produced by Gabriel Katzka.

Boorman had wanted Tolkien to have a cameo in his film, and corresponded with Tolkien about the project, telling him he intended to make it with small people playing the Hobbits and in live-action, which Tolkien preferred. He considered having children dressed with facial hair, dubbed by adult actors. Al Pacino was considered for Frodo, and Sauron is described in the script as looking like Mick Jagger. In retrospect, Boorman recognized that it "might have been" a disaster, saying that a trilogy was a wiser choice. Pallenberg was sorry that they never got to revise the script, which exists only as a rough draft; Boorman has described it as "almost unmakeable." Bakshi later exaggerated it as a 700-page screenplay, but at 178 pages, Boorman and Pallenberg wanted to reduce it to around 150.

The script added many new elements and modified others. It downplayed the Catholic aspects of the work in favour of a Jungian, surrealistic, counter-culture interpretation, with carnal elements. Gimli is put in a hole and beaten so he can retrieve the password to Moria from his ancestral memory; Frodo and Galadriel have sexual intercourse; Arwen is a teenaged spiritual guide, while her role as Aragorn's love interest is transferred to Éowyn; Aragorn's healing of Éowyn takes place on the battlefield and has sexual overtones; the Orcs turn good with Sauron's defeat. To cut costs, all flying steeds were removed. As in Boorman's other genre films, he let his earlier concept of Merlin influence his writing of Gandalf, while Galadriel's emergence from the lake recalls his Arthurian Lady of the Lake.

By the time Boorman returned to head of production, Mike Medavoy, the studio had suffered a series of commercial failures. David and Arnold Picker were replaced by Arthur B. Krim and Robert Benjamin, who had not read Tolkien's books. They were intrigued, but the script called for more expensive optical effects than was originally conceived, and the executives were unsure the audience would be sufficient, thinking the genre mostly appealed to children, and the project stalled. Boorman tried shopping the project at other studios. Disney were interested, but balked at the violence; no other studio was interested in making a widescreen epic. Boorman remembers that as late as 1975, "all I got was embarrassed smiles". In the early 1990s, Boorman again contacted Medavoy about The Lord of the Rings using new special effects technologies, but the project fell apart when Zaentz wanted more money, demanding merchandising rights for himself.

Animated films

Rankin/Bass's The Hobbit TV special (1977) 

In 1972, animators Rankin and Bass wanted to adapt Tolkien's works to animation as part of their series of television specials. Rankin thought adapting the whole Lord of the Rings was impossible and that the audience "wouldn't sit still for it." He decided "that the Tolkien property that I could handle was 'The Hobbit'," although portions of The Lord of the Rings were optioned as a sequel given pressure from the network. At $2 million to produce, the special would prove the costliest made up to that time, and starred John Huston, a fan of the book, as Gandalf.

They contacted the Tolkien Estate, who declined, but Rankin pointed out that the books were public domain in the US. The Estate, along with Saul Zaentz who had since purchased the film rights, tried to stop the production through a lawsuit, but it instead "became authorized through a series of settlement agreements" which allowed the special to air in Canada, where the books were not public domain.

The making of the special was announced in April 1973 by Tomorrow Entertainment. The designs were done by Rankin, Bass and several Japanese animators working in the United States. Lester Abrams sent Rankin 20 character designs after Rankin and Bass liked his work on an excerpt of Tolkien for Children's Digest at the time. He was brought on board again later in the production to help illustrate the Dwarves – basing Thorin on concept art for Disney's Grumpy. He also drew Gollum as a corrupted Hobbit, but Rankin insisted that he be made more ferocious. Romeo Muller, who had written previous teleplays for Rankin, was employed to write the teleplay. His first draft tried to encompass the whole of the story, plus a setup for The Lord of the Rings at the end. Rankin had him pare it down, and at one point also wanted to cut out the spiders, but was talked out of it by Lester. Beorn was "sacrificed" to keep the Spiders.

The television special received mixed reactions. In 1978, Romeo Muller won a Peabody Award for his teleplay. The film was also nominated for the Hugo Award for Best Dramatic Presentation, but lost to Star Wars. Douglas A. Anderson, a Tolkien scholar, called the adaptation "execrable" in his own introduction to the Annotated Hobbit, although he did not elaborate. Ian Nathan considers it "regrettable" and "twee."

Ralph Bakshi's The Lord of the Rings (1978) 

In 1957, Ralph Bakshi sought to obtain the rights for an animated version, aiming to make a Tolkienesque fantasy film "in the American idiom"; this led to the 1977 animated film Wizards. After Tolkien's death in 1973, Bakshi started an "annual trip" to Medavoy, proposing that United Artists produce The Lord of the Rings as two or three animated films, with a Hobbit prequel. Medavoy offered him Boorman's script, which Bakshi refused, saying that Boorman "didn't understand it" and that his script would have made for a cheap product like "a Roger Corman film". He later called the Rankin-Bass TV special an "awful, sell-out version of The Hobbit." Medavoy did not want to produce Bakshi's film, but allowed him to shop it around if he could get another studio to pay for the expenses on Boorman's script.

In 1976, Bakshi and Dan Melnick, then-president of Metro-Goldwyn-Mayer, made a deal with United Artists to purchase the film rights for $3 million (covering the cost of Boorman's screenwriting), and Bakshi started pre-production and writing, enlisting Chris Conkling to research the script. With $200,000 spent, Dan Melnick was fired from MGM. Bakshi persuaded Saul Zaentz to produce The Lord of the Rings. Zaentz had recently produced the Academy Award-winning adaptation of One Flew Over the Cuckoo's Nest, distributed by United Artists, and agreed to buy the project. UA stayed as the distributors. Zaentz was only able to offer a humble budget of $8 million. Since Bakshi was primarily interested in Tolkien's more adult-oriented novel, Zaentz's Fantasy Films procured the rights to The Lord of the Rings as well as the rights to produce The Hobbit. The rights to distribute the prequel remained with United Artists. Bakshi later clarified that he thought the film could "make some money" to save his studio after his previous film, Coonskin, failed commercially.

With Conkling, Bakshi considered how to divide the story. They contemplated a three-film structure, but "we didn't know how that middle film would work". Conkling started writing a single three-and-a-half hour feature of the entire work, but eventually settled on two 150-minute films. At one point, the story was to be told in flashback by Merry and Pippin to Treebeard as a setup for the second film, tentatively set to be released in 1980. Early drafts by Conkling included Farmer Maggot, Tom Bombadil, the Old Forest, Glorfindel, Arwen, and several songs. Conkling's work was deemed unsatisfactory by Bakshi and Zaentz, who brought in Peter S. Beagle to do rewrites. He insisted on a complete overhaul, and wrote a version which began at Bilbo's Farewell Party, and continued until Saruman's death, while Frodo and Sam left Cirith Ungol. This was abbreviated in later revisions to create a two-and-a-half hour movie. The final revisions overlapped with the voice recording in London, and account for inconsistencies like the spelling of "Saruman" (originally changed to Aruman to avoid confusion with Sauron) in the film. Bakshi constantly revised the story at the behest of anxious fans.

Bakshi was approached by Mick Jagger and David Carradine for roles in the film. Carradine even suggested that Bakshi do it in live-action, but Bakshi said it could not be done and that he had "always seen it as animation."

Bakshi went to England to recruit a voice cast from the BBC Drama Repertory Company, including Christopher Guard, William Squire, Michael Scholes, Anthony Daniels, and John Hurt. Bakshi then shot character actors playing to the recording in empty soundstages, and then rotoscoped the performances. Bakshi later regretted his use of the rotoscoping technique, stating that he made a mistake by tracing the source footage rather than using it as a guide. Live-action footage for crowd scenes was shot in Death Valley and in Spain. To cut costs, cinematographer Timothy Galfas suggested solarizing the crowd scenes rather than fully rotoscoping them, to create a pseudo-animated look. The film was animated in the United States by Bakshi's studio. Bakshi had only four weeks to edit the film, of which little was reportedly left on the cutting room floor. The whole project from pitch to release lasted about two years.

Arthur Krim was replaced at United Artists by Andy Albeck, who objected to marketing the film as the first of two parts. After test screenings, it was decided to switch the last two sequences, so that the film would not end on the cliffhanger of Frodo and Sam being led into a trap by Gollum. The film was released without any indication that a second part would follow, over Bakshi's objections. Rated PG, it was the longest animated film made at the time, and cost $8–12 million to produce; it grossed $30.5 million at the box office. However, the sum did not tempt the studio into making a sequel, and merchandise and VHS sales were not promising. The film won the Golden Gryphon at the 1980 Giffoni Film Festival, but critical reaction was mixed; Roger Ebert called Bakshi's effort a "mixed blessing" and "an entirely respectable, occasionally impressive job ... [which] still falls far short of the charm and sweep of the original story." Peter Jackson described the film's second half as "incoherent" and confusing.

Work began on a sequel, and Bakshi and Zaentz tried to stop Rankin and Bass from airing the Lord of the Rings television special to avoid overlap with their film, but in fearing a fall-off in revenue from the sequel, the studio would only sign-off on a budget half that of the first film, which led the already disheartened Bakshi to argue with Zaentz and quit. In 2000, Bakshi was still toying with making part two with Zaentz.

The BBC's 1981 radio adaptation recruited veterans of Bakshi's voice cast, Michael Graham Cox and Peter Woodthorpe, to reprise their roles (Boromir and Gollum, respectively) from the film. Sir Ian Holm (later to become Jackson's first choice for Bilbo Baggins) voiced Frodo.

Rankin/Bass's Return of the King TV special (1980) 

In 1980, Rankin/Bass more or less completed what Bakshi had started with their own animated adaptation of The Return of the King, based on their own concepts previously applied to their earlier animated adaptation of The Hobbit. In fact, contrary to reports that the film was made following the failure of Bakshi's film, it was already in pre-production before Rankin/Bass released The Hobbit. Zaentz and Bakshi sued Rankin and Bass in an attempt to prevent the television special from airing, but were unsuccessful. Rankin/Bass first titled the film Frodo: The Hobbit II, but as part of their settlement with Tolkien's estate, it was renamed The Return of the King, with the subtitle "A Story of Hobbits". In retrospect, Rankin expressed regret over the unsuccessful television special, saying "we shouldn't have made it."

Rights and influence 

Zaentz rejected many proposals for film adaptations in years to come, including from Mark Ordesky and John Boorman. Universal once contacted him for the rights, to no avail. In 1993, European producers commissioned a treatment for two or three live-action films, but terminated the project when it became apparent that Zaentz would not extend the rights to them. In 1997, Alan Lee was sent a script for a twelve-part TV adaptation by ITV Granada, for which they "couldn't get the approval" from Zaentz. Franco Zeffirelli, Jake Kasdan, Sir Ridley Scott, The Hobbit was an influence on George Lucas's Star Wars, and he later entered a lucrative partnership with Spielberg in producing and writing the stories for his Indiana Jones films. It was supposedly Lucas' inability to acquire the rights to The Hobbit (which would have been split between Zaentz and UA, anyway) that led to the creation of An Ewok Adventure and Willow, both heavily indebted to The Hobbit. Willow was eventually directed by Ron Howard, financed by Lucasfilm and distributed by MGM, and its inability to make substantial profits ended the high-fantasy productions of the 1980s. Nevertheless, Spielberg's DreamWorks Pictures reportedly tried for the rights in the early 1990s.

European live-action television productions 

The first live-action adaptations of Tolkien were European television productions made in the 1970s and early 1990s, mostly unlicensed. In 1971, the Swedish broadcaster Sveriges Television aired Sagan om Ringen, a short broadcast in two parts, consisting of live-action actors against animated backgrounds. It was based on The Fellowship of the Ring, and directed by Bo Hansson, who had previously made a music album based on The Lord of the Rings, under license from the Tolkien Estate. The short can no longer be viewed outside Sweden.

In 1985, the Soviet Union aired The Fabulous Journey of Mr. Bilbo Baggins the Hobbit, a television special based on the events of The Hobbit. Shot in 1984 as a teleplay and produced in the framework of the children's television series Tale after Tale, it featured actors such as Zinovy Gerdt as Narrator (Tolkien), Mikhail Danilov as Bilbo Baggins, Anatoly Ravikovich as Thorin and Igor Dmitriev as Gollum. Work on a combined animated/stop motion Hobbit cartoon, titled Treasures Under the Mountain, started in 1991, but the production stopped at an early stage, and only a six-minute intro is known to exist.

A live-action adaptation of The Fellowship of the Ring, Khraniteli ("Keepers" or "Guardians" [of the Ring]) was aired once in the Soviet Union in 1991, and was thought lost, but has been rediscovered and republished on the Web. It includes plot elements such as Tom Bombadil and the Barrow-wight omitted from Jackson's version, but has basic sets and "ludicrous" green-screen effects.

In 1993, the Finnish broadcaster Yle produced a live-action miniseries called Hobitit ("The Hobbits"). Despite the name it was based on The Lord of the Rings rather than The Hobbit; but it included only the parts of the story that the hobbits had witnessed themselves (hence the title). The nine episodes were aired on Yle TV1. The series was written and directed by Timo Torikka. Toni Edelmann composed the soundtrack. Actors included Pertti Sveholm as Sam, Taneli Mäkelä as Frodo, Martti Suosalo as Bilbo, Matti Pellonpää as Saruman, Vesa Vierikko as Gandalf, Ville Virtanen as Legolas, Kari Väänänen (as both Aragorn and Gollum) and Leif Wager as Elrond. This is the only film adaptation which includes "The Scouring of the Shire", and, before the recovery of the Soviet movie, was the only one known to include Tom Bombadil and the Barrow-wight. It aired again in 1998, but then the rights to broadcast it were revoked.

Warner Bros. and New Line Cinema

Peter Jackson's film series 

Jackson brought Middle-earth to the big screen in six live-action feature films released by Warner Bros. Jackson first pitched the idea of adapting The Lord of the Rings and The Hobbit to Miramax in 1995. He had seen Bakshi's Lord of the Rings in 1978, enjoyed it and "wanted to know more", reading a tie-in version of the book and listening to the 1981 BBC radio adaptation. Assuming that it would be made into a live-action film eventually, he read about previous attempts to adapt the work - by Boorman, Kubrick and Lean - but did not know what was myth and what was not at the time. He also watched and enjoyed (but did not think very highly of) the fantasy films and space operas of the 1980s. He later read Tolkien's letters and learned that Forrest Ackerman, who appeared in Jackson's Bad Taste, had tried to make a film, as well.

While he was aware that "three films would obviously be the more natural way to do" The Lord of the Rings and that The Hobbit would better be split across two films, he made a more modest offer of a trilogy: one film based on The Hobbit which, if proven successful, would be followed by two Lord of the Rings installments, released six months apart. Although Jackson and Walsh re-read The Hobbit and even commissioned their workshop at WETA for some concept art, the rights to The Hobbit proved difficult because they were split between Zaentz and United Artists. Harvey Weinstein tried to purchase them from the studio, but was unsuccessful.

It was decided to move ahead with The Lord of the Rings, leaving The Hobbit as a possible prequel. Jackson insisted on making two films (and even suggested three); the Weinsteins "blanched" but agreed on two films. While filming, Jackson told Elijah Wood he was not interested in directing The Hobbit, but during post-production on The Two Towers, spoke more enthusiastically of it with composer Howard Shore. Jackson also later made remarks about potential spinoff films and even half-joking remarks about television spin-off shows.

The Lord of the Rings film trilogy (2001–2003) 

Eventually, it became clear that the scope of the project was beyond Miramax' ability to finance on its own. An appeal to its parent company of Disney to manufacture additional funding was denied: CEO Michael Eisner later claimed this was because Harvey Weinstein refused to show him the scripts, but his decision to split the percentage evenly with the Weinsteins may speak to a more fundamental mistrust in the project. Harvey looked to co-operate with other studios, but was unsuccessful.

The Weinsteins suggested reducing the project to a single, two-hour film. Jackson was willing to consider this, if the film was to be around four hours in length, but Miramax limited it to two hours, and offered suggestions in order to achieve this, namely amalgamating Gondor and Rohan. They contacted Hossein Amini to rewrite and threatened to get John Madden or Quentin Tarantino to direct. Jackson believes this was an empty threat to get him to concede to the one-film version. He refused, but his agent Ken Kamins convinced Harvey Weinstein that getting another filmmaker to work on the project will result in further delays and costs, at which point Harvey conceded to give Jackson the opportunity to find another studio to take over.

Robert Zemeckis, Universal and DreamWorks declined. Fox were interested, but unwilling to enter a project involving Saul Zaentz, and Sony and Centropolis did not find the scripts to their liking. Harvey Weinstein limited the turnaround to three weeks, hoping that (by rendering it impossible for Jackson to find a studio in time) Jackson would have to come back to him and do the one-film version.

In 1999, New Line Cinema assumed production responsibility (while Miramax executives Bob Weinstein and Harvey Weinstein retained on-screen credits as executive producers). The three films were shot simultaneously. They featured extensive computer-generated imagery, including major battle scenes utilizing the "Massive" software program. The first film, subtitled The Fellowship of the Ring, was released on 19 December 2001, the second film, subtitled The Two Towers, on 18 December 2002 and the third film, subtitled The Return of the King, worldwide on 17 December 2003. 
All three won the Hugo Award for Best (Long-form) Dramatic Presentation in their respective years.

The films met with both critical and commercial success. With a total of 30 nominations, the trilogy became the most-nominated in the Academy's history, surpassing the Godfather series' 28 (with the release of The Hobbit, the series currently has 36 nominations total). Of these, Jackson's adaptations garnered seventeen Oscar statuettes and three Scientific and Technical awards: four for The Fellowship of the Ring, two for The Two Towers, eleven for The Return of the King plus two Scientific and Technical Awards, and one such award for An Unexpected Journey, "for the development of the Tissue Physically–Based Character Simulation Framework."

The Return of the King won all the eleven awards for which it was nominated, including Best Picture; as well as a Technical Achievement Award and the Scientific and Engineering Award. Titanic six years earlier and the 1959 version of Ben-Hur each won eleven awards overall, an industry record until the release of The Return of the King. The film also broke the previous "sweep" record, beating Gigi and The Last Emperor, which each took 9 out of 9.

The Return of the King made movie history as the highest-grossing film opening on a Wednesday and was the second film after Titanic to earn over US$1 billion worldwide. The Lord of the Rings film trilogy is verified to be the currently highest grossing motion picture trilogy worldwide of all time, evidenced by its earning close to $3-billion (US). Critical acclaim has commonly hailed the trilogy as "the greatest films of our era," and "the trilogy will not soon, if ever, find its equal."

The series drew acclaim from within the industry, including from people formerly interested in adapting Tolkien: Ackerman, who appeared on Jackson's Bad Taste said his pitch "could never have been given the grand treatment that Peter Jackson afforded it." Deitch thought the films were "serious and great." McCartney said he loved the films, and watched them each Christmas with his family. Boorman was happy about his film's cancellation, as it resulted in Jackson's films.

On the other hand, Edelmann said he thought it was "badly directed," and "Tolkein wasn't such a great storyteller." Bakshi felt (incorrectly) that the film was derivative of his own without due acknowledgment, and that Jackson "didn't really get it." However, he did praise the effects of "thousands of men in armies attacks each other." Bakshi's writer, Peter Beagle, said Jackson has done it the only way possible, by making three different movies" and one of Bakshi's animators, Michael Ploog, said the trilogy was "brilliantly handled."

The Hobbit film trilogy (2012–2014) 

Jackson was unsure if he should direct The Hobbit, so as to not compete with himself, but he did want to produce and write an adaptation of the book. He considered helming a Hobbit film and a Lord of the Rings prequel film in 2006, before deciding to produce two films based on The Hobbit for a director of his choosing. New Line suggested Sam Raimi to direct, but in 2008, Guillermo Del Toro was chosen to direct a two-film adaptation, produced by Jackson and co-written with Walsh, Boyens and Del Toro. Time constraints caused Del Toro to bow out, and Jackson stepped in to direct. Other directors said to have been considered are Neill Blomkamp, David Yates, David Dobkin and Bret Ratner.

During principal photography, Jackson looked at assembled footage and decided to split the piece into three instalments, released between 2012 and 2014. The three films are subtitled An Unexpected Journey, The Desolation of Smaug and The Battle of the Five Armies. As with The Lord of the Rings trilogy, the prequel movies were filmed back to back in New Zealand; principal photography began on 21 March 2011.

The films star Martin Freeman as Bilbo Baggins, Richard Armitage as Thorin Oakenshield and Benedict Cumberbatch as Smaug. Several actors from The Lord of the Rings reprised their roles, including Ian McKellen, Andy Serkis, Hugo Weaving, Cate Blanchett, Christopher Lee, Ian Holm, Elijah Wood and Orlando Bloom.

Also returning were the heads of almost all departments in the production: the only major changes in the staff were of the role of the gaffer (after Brian Bansgrove died) and with stunt co-ordinator Glen Boswall replacing George Marshall Ruge. Editor Jabez Olssen, who worked on the editing of the Rings trilogy, edited all three Hobbit films.

Middle-earth: Shadow of War – Friend or Foe (2017) 

In September 2017, Neil Huxley directed a series of interactive short films titled Middle-earth: Shadow of War – Friend or Foe, in promotion for the then-upcoming action role-playing video game of the same name, developed by Monolith Productions, published by Warner Bros. Interactive Entertainment, and serving as a sequel to 2014's Middle-earth: Shadow of Mordor. Set between both games and Peter Jackson's The Hobbit and The Lord of the Rings film trilogies, Friend or Foe continues the previous game's narrative, of the story of Talion, the Gondorian Ranger who bonded with the wraith of the Elf Lord Celebrimbor, as they forge a new Ring of Power to amass an army to fight against Sauron. Model and rugby player Ashley Beck portrays Talion/Celebrimbor in the films, replacing Troy Baker from the games, while professional fighters Steve Lewington and Spencer Wilding portray orcs.

The Lord of the Rings: The War of the Rohirrim (2024)

In June 2021, New Line announced an anime prequel about Helm Hammerhand, a legendary King of Rohan, set some 250 years before the events of The Lord of the Rings. Kenji Kamiyama will direct the film, titled The Lord of the Rings: The War of the Rohirrim. The script is by Jeffrey Addiss and Will Matthews, with Philippa Boyens consulting.

Amazon Studios

The Lord of the Rings: The Rings of Power (2022–present) 

Amazon bought the television rights for The Lord of the Rings for US$250 million in November 2017, making a five-season production commitment worth at least US$1 billion. This would make it the most expensive television series ever made. The series is primarily based on the appendices of The Lord of the Rings, which include discussion of the Second Age, and it features a large cast from around the world. For legal reasons, it is not a direct continuation of the The Lord of the Rings and The Hobbit film trilogies, but the production intended to evoke the films with similar production design and younger versions of the same incarnations of characters who appear in them. The season premiered on Prime Video on September 2, 2022.

Fan films 

The Hunt for Gollum, a fan film based on elements of the appendices to The Lord of the Rings, was released on the internet in May 2009. It is set between the events of The Hobbit and The Fellowship of the Ring, and depicts Aragorn's quest to find Gollum. The film's visual style is based on that of the Jackson films. Although unofficial, it has received coverage in major media.

Another fan made feature film, Born of Hope, produced and directed by Kate Madison, was released online on 1 December 2009 on Dailymotion and later on YouTube. It is set before the events of The Hobbit. The film can be streamed freely on its main website. Like The Hunt for Gollum, this film triggered reviews in various media.

Box office performance

Public and critical reception

See also 

 Adaptations of The Hobbit
 Adaptations of The Lord of the Rings

Notes

References 

Film series introduced in 1977
Films
 
Television series set in Middle-earth